Rubicon Technology, Inc. is an American company specializing in sapphire crystal growth technology and large-diameter sapphire based on improved Kyropoulos technology called ES2.  Improvements to the Kyropoulos technology were developed in its Illinois-based crystal growth facilities. The company has been producing the industry's first 12-inch sapphire wafer since 2010, and has shipped millions of wafers and core products in sizes from 2" to 12" since 2001. The company's products have been used in the LED industry and for the production of silicon on sapphire (SOS) wafers for integrated circuits (RFICs), as well as on high quality optical and industrial applications for high performance sapphire. The company's current market capitalization is down from around US$200 million to $13 million, with an enterprise value (November 2013 to December 2016) from around $160 million to less than zero.

History
In 2000, Rubicon Technology began its commercial production and was incorporated in 2001. It had successful growth of 30 kg sapphire boule in 2002. In 2003, its polishing capacity was added and it received ISO9001 certification in the following year. In 2013, Rubicon launched 4" and 6" Patterned Sapphire Substrates (PSS), extending vertical integration "from powder to pattern".

Products
Rubicon Technology is engaged in developing, manufacturing and selling monocrystalline sapphire and other crystalline products for light-emitting diodes (LEDs), radio-frequency integrated circuits (RFICs), optoelectronics, and other optical applications.

Rubicon Technology produces Patterned Sapphire Substrates (PSS) in 4" through 8" diameters. The company also produces sapphire ingots, which are used as raw material for further fabrication. Additionally, Rubicon produces optical windows, with applications ranging from defense/aerospace and instrumentation to medical devices, and polished epi-ready substrates.

References

External links
 

Technology companies of the United States
Companies established in 2001
Companies based in DuPage County, Illinois
Bensenville, Illinois
Companies listed on the Nasdaq